The 1980 World Figure Skating Championships were held in Dortmund, West Germany from March 11 to 16. At the event, sanctioned by the International Skating Union, medals were awarded in men's singles, ladies' singles, pair skating, and ice dance.

The ISU Representative was John R. Shoemaker and the ISU Technical Delegate was Josef Dědič.

Medal tables

Medalists

Medals by country

Results

Men

Referee:
 Sonia Bianchetti 

Assistant Referee:
 Benjamin T. Wright 

Judges:
 Geoffrey Yates 
 Tatiana Danilenko 
 Jane Sullivan 
 David Dore 
 Walburga Grimm 
 Eva von Gamm 
 Monique Georgelin 
 Tsukasa Kimura 
 Marie-Louise von Friedrichs 
 Václav Skála

Ladies
*: better placed due to the majority of the better placings

Referee:
 Elemér Terták 

Assistant Referee:
 Donald H. Gilchrist 

Judges:
 Yvonne Tutt 
 Ludwig Gassner 
 Liudmila Kubashevskaia 
 Giorgio Siniscalco 
 Jürg Wilhelm 
 Ingrid Linke 
 Junko Hiramatsu 
 Elsbeth Bon 
 Gerhard Frey 
 Hely Abbondati

Pairs

Referee:
 Oskar Madl 

Assistant Referee:
 Eugen Romminger 

Judges:
 Tiasha Andrée 
 Liudmila Kubashevskaya 
 Sally-Anne Stapleford 
 Václav Skála 
 Audrey Williams 
 Junko Hiramatsu 
 Helga von Wiecki 
 Willi Wenz 
 Mary Louise Wright 
 Thérèse Maisel

Ice dance

Referee:
 Lawrence Demmy 

Assistant Referee:
 Erika Schiechtl 

Judges:
 Oskar Urban 
 Elaine DeMore 
 Willi Wenz 
 Ferenc Kertész 
 Lysiane Lauret 
 Pamela Davis 
 Igor Kabanov 
 Suzanne Francis 
 Tsukasa Kimura 
 Cia Bordogna

Sources
 Result list provided by the ISU

World Figure Skating Championships
World Figure Skating Championships
World Figure Skating Championships
International figure skating competitions hosted by West Germany
March 1980 sports events in Europe
Sports competitions in Dortmund
1980s in North Rhine-Westphalia
20th century in Dortmund